Lindås is a village in Alver municipality in Vestland county, Norway.

The village was the old administrative centre of Lindås, prior to the 1964 merger that greatly expanded the municipality. Lindås Church is located in the village.

References

Villages in Vestland
Alver (municipality)